Mark Ghafari (born December 10, 1991 in Grosse Pointe, MI) is a Lebanese American professional basketball player who previously played for Sporting Al Riyadi Beirut in the Lebanese Basketball League.

Professional career
He started his professional career in 2014 after he played a season for Kalamazoo College in the NCAA Division 3 Tournament. Earlier in 2013, Ghafari travelled to Lebanon to perform a medical for Al Riyadi whereupon he was signed for three years. 

He has since retired from professional basketball and now lives in Michigan.

References

External links
 Profile at asia-basket.com

1991 births
Living people
People from Grosse Pointe Shores, Michigan
Sportspeople from Metro Detroit
Lebanese men's basketball players
Shooting guards
Al Riyadi Club Beirut basketball players